Ballet Ireland is an Irish ballet company, established in 1998 by Günther Falusy and Anne Maher. Presenting a broad repertoire, it has been funded by the Arts Council of Ireland since 1999 and is under the sole patronage of Irish President Michael D. Higgins since 2013.

History
Following various previous ventures, ballet in Ireland had a "home" in the Irish National Ballet, founded in 1973 and overseen by Joan Denise Moriarty. However, following a series of funding cuts, the company was disbanded in 1989 and doubt was expressed whether classical ballet could survive in Ireland.  In 1998, Ballet Ireland was founded in Dublin by choreographer and dancer Günther Falusy (1946–2017), and the professional ballet dancer Anne Maher, to re-establish classical ballet in the capital. The opening production was at the Gaiety Theatre, Dublin.  The Arts Council of Ireland provided substantial grants from 1999 to 2003, allowing the new company to become established.
This funding has continued, allowing annual performances and tours throughout Ireland and to a lesser extent in the UK.
Since then, the company has presented over 30 seasons of work and is also involved in educational programmes such as professional workshops and summer schools. In 2013, the President of Ireland, Michael D. Higgins, a former Arts Minister, became the patron of the company.

Performances
Ballet Ireland began with a conventional repertoire of well-known ballets such as The Nutcracker, Swan Lake and The Sleeping Beauty. Once fully established, it started to take works on tour, for example, a production of Giselle from 2017, performed at the Edinburgh Festival Fringe in 2018 which The Guardian called "part modern murder mystery, part romantic ballet classic" and Anna Winter in The Stage described as a "full-blooded re-imagining staged with zeal". The company has also extended its range of works to include contemporary dance and reinterpretations of classic ballets.
The company collaborated with the Irish Chamber Orchestra on a 2014 production of Rodion Shchedrin's Carmen Suite (ballet) and with the RTÉ Concert Orchestra on a number of productions.

References

External links 
 Official website

Ballet companies in Ireland
1998 establishments in Ireland
Performing groups established in 1998